Hadamou Traoré (born 7 September 1993) is a French professional footballer who plays as a midfielder for Belgian club 
Union SG.

Club career
Traoré began playing football in his hometown of Paris, eventually joining the Nantes academy in 2008, where he played up to the under-19 level. After failing to get a pro contract from the team, he made the switch to Paris FC in 2011, where he played one more year in the under-19 league.

After a two-year break from football, he joined Le Pontet in the fourth-tier Championnat de France Amateur for the 2014–15 season. Midway through the year, he made the move to Monts d'Or Azergues. He signed with Drancy of the newly-named Championnat National 2 in the summer of 2017.

In June 2018, Traoré was signed by Belgian First Division B side Union SG on a two-year deal. He made his professional debut a few months later, coming on for Charles Morren during an away win against OH Leuven on 16 November.

Personal life
Born in France, Traoré is of Mauritanian descent. His older brother, Bouna, died from electrocution in 2005 at a building site in the Clichy-sous-Bois suburbs of Paris while hiding from police, an event that unleashed weeks of violent protests across the country addressing the issue of police harassment in poorer immigrant communities.

References

External links
 
 Hadamou Traoré at Foot-national
 
 

Living people
1993 births
French footballers
Association football midfielders
US Pontet Grand Avignon 84 players
GOAL FC players
JA Drancy players
Royale Union Saint-Gilloise players
Championnat National 2 players
Challenger Pro League players
French expatriate footballers
French expatriate sportspeople in Belgium
Expatriate footballers in Belgium
French sportspeople of Mauritanian descent
Black French sportspeople
Footballers from Paris